Mo Zhixin (born December 10, 1995) is a Chinese female acrobatic gymnast. With partner Zhang Zhiyun, Mo competed in the 2014 Acrobatic Gymnastics World Championships.

References

1995 births
Living people
Chinese acrobatic gymnasts
Female acrobatic gymnasts